Iridomyrmex adstringatus is a species of ant of the genus Iridomyrmex. Recently described in 2011 by Heterick & Shattuck, the species is rare to find, as specimens of this species have only been collected in South Australia. The first specimens collected were from the Coorong National Park.

Etymology
In Latin, adstringatus is translated to "compressed" or "drawn together", which is in reference to the appearance of Iridomyrmex adstringatus ants.

References

Iridomyrmex
Hymenoptera of Australia
Insects described in 2011